Catapastus is a genus of flower weevils in the beetle family Curculionidae. There are about nine described species in Catapastus.

Species
These nine species belong to the genus Catapastus:
 Catapastus albonotatus Linell, 1897
 Catapastus conspersus (LeConte, 1876)
 Catapastus diffusus Casey, 1892
 Catapastus nivescens Champion & G.C., 1909
 Catapastus ruficlava Champion & G.C., 1909
 Catapastus seriatus Casey, 1920
 Catapastus signatipennis Linell, 1897
 Catapastus simplex Casey, 1920
 Catapastus squamirostris Casey, 1920

References

Further reading

 
 
 

Baridinae
Articles created by Qbugbot